Bernard Curry (born 27 March 1974) is an Australian actor, best known for his role as Jake Stewart in Wentworth, Luke Handley in Neighbours and Hugo Austin in Home and Away.

Career
Curry first appeared in Neighbours in 1995 as Luke Handley, and remained on the television series for just over a year. He later returned to the show in a video cameo appearance in 2005 for the programme's 20th anniversary.

Curry was a co-writer and actor on the 2002 ABC sketch comedy series Flipside. In 2002, he starred in the American television movie Junction Boys. He later starred in the 2007 TV film The King, and the 2005 feature film Puppy. Curry was also the host of the comedy series Monster House on the Nine Network. In 2008 Curry appeared in the BBC-commissioned soap opera Out of the Blue, playing Nate Perrett. In late 2008, Curry had the small role of Vishnu on Packed to the Rafters, on the Seven Network. In 2009, Curry joined the soap opera Home and Away as Hugo Austin, and left in 2010. He hosted the first four seasons of Beauty and the Geek Australia, from 2009 to 2012.

In 2016 Curry joined the cast of Wentworth (TV series) as corrupt officer Jake Stewart. Curry revealed that he almost said no to the role as he was busy with his career in LA, but his close friend Sullivan Stapleton told him to audition for the show as Wentworth had become so popular during its first three seasons, so he did. Curry joined the cast for filming and stayed until the show's final season. Curry has stated that Wentworth was one of the best jobs he has ever had.

Curry appeared as sports agent Jesse Reade in the 2013 first season of the American VH1 series, Hit the Floor. From 2016 and onward.

In August 2021, Curry was announced as a contestant on the celebrity version of Big Brother Australia.

In 2022 Curry joined the cast of ABC drama Savage River and filmed 2023 series Crazy Fun Park, Curry also returned to the Melbourne Theatre company for the 2022 season of 'A Christmas Carol'.

Filmography

Film

Television

References

External links

Bernard Curry's profile at homeandaway.com.au
Bernard Curry on Instagram 

1974 births
Living people
Australian comics writers
Australian male film actors
Australian male soap opera actors
Male actors from Melbourne
20th-century Australian male actors
21st-century Australian male actors